The Pakawan languages were a small language family spoken in what is today northern Mexico and southern Texas. All Pakawan languages are today extinct.

Classification
Five clear Pakawan languages are attested: Coahuilteco, Cotoname, Comecrudo, Garza and Mamulique. The first three were first proposed to be related by John Wesley Powell in 1891, in a grouping then called Coahuiltecan. Goddard (1979) groups the latter three in a Comecrudan family while considering the others language isolates. The current composition and the present name "Pakawan" are due to Manaster Ramer (1996).

The term Coahuiltecan languages today refers to a slightly expanded and less securely established grouping. Most Pakawan languages have at times been included also in the much larger and highly hypothetical Hokan "stock".

Common vocabulary
The following word comparisons are given by Manaster Ramer (1996):

The following sound changes and correspondences should be noted:
 Vocalization of word-final *l in Cotoname: 'sun', 'straw', red'
 Lenition of *p to /xw/ in Coahuilteco between vowels: #apel', #mapi
 Syncope of 
 Apocope of final e (perhaps ) in Comecrudo: 'man', 'low [water]', 'to kneel'.
 /k/, /kw/ in other languages correspond to /x/, /xw/ in Cotoname, when before /a/ ('man', 'low [water]', 'to eat', 'to suck', 'to write'), as well as in Coahuilteco, when before any low vowel (__examples).
 /kiV/ in Comecrudo corresponds to /kuV/ in Coahuilteco: 'blood', 'to go'
 s ~ l (perhaps indicating a lateral fricative ) in Comecrudo corresponds to s in Coahuilteco: Comecrudo 'blood', 'devil', 'to fall'.
 Initial y in Comecrudo corresponds to /ts/ in Coahuilteco: I, chest, to hear

References

Further reading
 Manaster Ramer, Alexis. 1996. Sapir's Classifications: Coahuiltecan. Anthropological Linguistics 38/1, 1–38.
 Sapir, Edward. 1920. The Hokan and Coahuiltecan languages. International Journal of American Linguistics, 1 (4), 280-290.
 Swanton, John R. (1915). Linguistic position of the tribes of southern Texas and northeastern Mexico. American Anthropologist, 17, 17–40.

 
Coahuiltecan languages
Proposed language families
Indigenous languages of Mexico
Indigenous languages of the Southwestern United States
Indigenous languages of the North American Southwest